The Cook Memorial Library, also known as the Ansel B. Cook House, is a historic house museum in Libertyville, Illinois, United States.  It was built as a Victorian house for contractor and politician Ansel B. Cook in 1878.  In his will Cook donated the home to be used as a public library, although it remained for many years the residence of Cook's longer-lived widow.  After Emily Barrows Cook's death, the building received a major Neoclassical renovation that converted it into a library, opening to the public in 1921.

By the 1960s the library had outgrown the space available, and voters approved a referendum to construct a new library.  The new facility of what is now the Cook Memorial Public Library District opened directly behind the Cook House in 1968.

The building was listed on the U.S. National Register of Historic Places in 2001.  Today the Libertyville–Mundelein Historical Society operates the house as a Victorian house museum.

References

External links

 Ansel B. Cook House

Historic house museums in Illinois
Houses completed in 1878
Houses in Lake County, Illinois
Houses on the National Register of Historic Places in Illinois
Libertyville, Illinois
Libraries on the National Register of Historic Places in Illinois
Museums in Lake County, Illinois
National Register of Historic Places in Lake County, Illinois
Public libraries in Illinois